The Countryman magazine was founded in 1927 by J. W. Robertson Scott, who edited it from his office in Idbury in rural Oxfordshire for the first 21 years. He was succeeded as editor by John Cripps, son of Stafford Cripps. It is now edited by Lorraine Connolly, the first woman to hold this role in the history of the magazine, at offices in Skipton Castle, North Yorkshire. It was published quarterly until the 1990s, when it became a bimonthly. It is now a monthly, with a circulation of about 23,000.

In the 1950s, it described itself as "A quarterly non-party review and miscellany of rural life and work for the English-speaking world". Today its website says: "The Countryman focuses on the rural issues of today and tomorrow, as well as including features on the people, places, history and wildlife that make the British countryside so special."

In the Winter 1948 issue Field Marshal Wavell wrote a tribute in verse to the magazine's eclecticism, one stanza of which reads:

  The ethics of "bundling", the methods of trundling
  A wheelbarrow, trolley or pram, 
  Dogs, badgers and sheep, a girl chimney-sweep, 
  The way to make strawberry jam; 
  Dunmow and its flitches, the trial of witches, 
  The somnambulation of wigeon, 
  You’ll find them all here, with discourses on beer
  And maternal lactation in pigeon.

To mark the magazine's 80th birthday, Words from the Countryman, edited by Valerie Porter, a selection of writing from the magazine, along with brief historical notes, was published in 2007. Porter notes that, whereas The Countryman had begun as a magazine principally for and about the farmer and others who live in the country, from the early 1980s until recently it often tended to favour the views of urban-dwellers who take their leisure in the country, many of whom are antagonistic to farmers.

References

External links
The Countryman magazine

Further reading
 Valerie Porter, ed., Words from the Countryman, David & Charles, Newton Abbot, 2007.
 J.W. Robertson Scott, ed., The Countryman Book: A selection of articles and illustrations from the Countryman, Odhams, London, 1948.

1927 establishments in England
Bi-monthly magazines published in the United Kingdom
Magazines established in 1927
Monthly magazines published in the United Kingdom
Quarterly magazines published in the United Kingdom
Mass media in Yorkshire
Lifestyle magazines published in the United Kingdom